Marta Moszczenska is a Canadian diplomat who was Ambassador to Romania from 2006 until 2009 with concurrent accreditation to Moldova, Bulgaria and high commissioner to Cyprus as well as Consul General in Buffalo, New York.

Moszczenska earned a BA from Carleton University in 1981.

References

Canadian women ambassadors
Ambassadors of Canada to Romania
Ambassadors of Canada to Moldova
Ambassadors of Canada to Bulgaria
Consuls
Carleton University alumni
Year of birth missing (living people)
Living people